Concert on the Rock was an international rock festival that took place in Nakatsu city, Ōita Prefecture, 
Japan. It was in aid of UNICEF, and was established in 2004.

It had J-Pop, rock, salsa, cumbia, reggae, punk, dance, nu jazz, and traditional folk performances. The 2005 edition was held on May 14 and 15. Due to noise complaints over the past years, organizers have taken the decision to discontinue the event.

External links 
 COTR 2005

Rock festivals in Japan
Music festivals in Japan
Recurring events established in 2004